Ein Tag schreibt Geschichte is a German television series.

See also
List of German television series

2011 German television series debuts
2011 German television series endings
German documentary television series
German-language television shows